Wakhi may be:

 Wakhi language, the language of the majority of the people of Wakhan
 Wakhi people, an ethnic group in Wakhan, Afghanistan and the Northern Territories of Pakistan
 An adjectival form of Wakhan, the extreme northeastern region of Afghanistan that borders China, Tajikistan, and Pakistan

Language and nationality disambiguation pages